Goniofusus is a genus of sea snails, marine gastropod mollusks in the subfamily Fusininae of the family Fasciolariidae, the spindle snails, the tulip snails and their allies.

Species
Species within the genus Goniofusus include:
 † Goniofusus baumanni (Maury, 1925) 
 Goniofusus brasiliensis (Grabau, 1904)
 Goniofusus dupetitthouarsi (Kiener, 1840)
 † Goniofusus haitensis (G. B. Sowerby I, 1850) 
 Goniofusus spectrum (A. Adams & Reeve, 1848)
 Goniofusus strigatus (Philippi, 1850)
 Goniofusus turris (Valenciennes, 1832)

References

 Vermeij G.J. & Snyder M.A. (2018). Proposed genus-level classification of large species of Fusininae (Gastropoda, Fasciolariidae). Basteria. 82(4-6): 57–82.

 
Gastropod genera